The 2005 ATS Formel 3 Cup was a multi-event motor racing championship for single-seat open wheel formula racing cars that held across Europe. The championship featured drivers competing in two-litre Formula Three racing cars built by Dallara which conform to the technical regulations, or formula, for the championship. It was the third edition of the ATS F3 Cup. It commenced on 23 April at Oschersleben and ended on 9 October at the same place after nine double-header rounds.

Jo Zeller Racing driver Peter Elkmann clinched the championship title. He collected six wins, to overcome his closest rival Michael Devaney by 49 points, who won five races. The third place went to Ho-Pin Tung, who was victorious at both the opening and final race of the season at Oschersleben. Seyffarth Motorsport Pascal Kochem didn't achieve a race win but had eight podiums and won the Rookie Cup. Frank Kechele, who completed the top-five, lost eight points to Kochem in both main and rookie standings. Other wins were shared between Martin Hippe, Ferdinand Kool and Jan Seyffarth, who clinched both the Trophy and Rookie titles.

Teams and drivers
All drivers competed in Dallara chassis; model listed.

Calendar
With the exception of round at TT Circuit Assen, all rounds took place on German soil.

Results

ATS Formel 3 Cup

Points are awarded as follows:

References

External links
 

German Formula Three Championship seasons
Formula Three season
German
German Formula 3 Championship